This article is a list of seasons completed by the Minnesota Timberwolves of the National Basketball Association.  The Timberwolves joined the NBA as an expansion team for the 1989–90 NBA season, along with the Orlando Magic.

Table key

Seasons

Notes 
 Due to a lockout, the 1998–99 season did not start until February 5, 1999, and all 29 teams played a shortened regular season schedule of 50 games.
 Due to a lockout, the 2011–12 season did not start until December 25, 2011, and all 30 teams played a shortened regular season schedule of 66 games.
 Due to the COVID-19 pandemic, the 2019–20 season was suspended on March 11, 2020, and the regular season was shortened to 64 games for the Timberwolves.
 Due to the COVID-19 pandemic, the 2020–21 season did not start until December 22, 2020, and all 30 teams played a shortened regular season schedule of 72 games.

References

External links
Minnesota Timberwolves at Basketball Reference
Minnesota Timberwolves at Land of Basketball

 
seasons
Events in Minneapolis